The British Virgin Islands was represented at the 2006 Commonwealth Games in Melbourne.

Medals

Gold

Silver

Bronze

British Virgin Islands at the Commonwealth Games
Nations at the 2006 Commonwealth Games
Commonwealth Games